David S. Creigh House, also known as the "Montescena" and Boone Farm, is a historic home located near Lewisburg, Greenbrier County, West Virginia.  Although the house has "outstanding architectural features", it is most known for being the site of the 1863 death of a Union soldier which led to the execution of David S. Creigh, the owner, in 1864.

The house was built for Creigh in 1834, and is a -story, brick rectangular residence.  The original Greek Revival style portico has been changed twice.  It now features a deep, two-story porch supported by six large, wooden columns.  The front facade also has the two dormers with Palladian windows.

The house may have been designed by architect John W. Dunn, a friend of Creigh.  Creigh, in the house, apparently killed a Union soldier, and was eventually sentenced to hang.  Dunn sought to speak in support of Creigh but was not allowed.  Part of the punishment was that the house would be burned, but that was not carried out.

The house was listed on the National Register of Historic Places in 1975.

References

Houses on the National Register of Historic Places in West Virginia
Greek Revival houses in West Virginia
Houses in Greenbrier County, West Virginia
Houses completed in 1834
National Register of Historic Places in Greenbrier County, West Virginia
John W. Dunn buildings
Palladian Revival architecture in West Virginia